Ban Tong is a tambon (subdistrict) of Seka District, in Bueng Kan Province, Thailand. In 2020 it had a total population of 11,438 people.

History
The subdistrict was created effective May 16, 1968 by splitting off 9 administrative villages from Pho Mak Khaeng.

Administration

Central administration
The tambon is subdivided into 15 administrative villages (muban).

Local administration
The whole area of the subdistrict is covered by the subdistrict administrative organization (SAO) Ban Tong (องค์การบริหารส่วนตำบลบ้านต้อง).

References

External links
Thaitambon.com on Ban Tong

Tambon of Bueng Kan province
Populated places in Bueng Kan province